Ribeira Sacra is a Spanish Denominación de Origen Protegida (DOP) (Denominación de Orixe Protexida in Galician) for wines located in the south of the province of Lugo and in the north of the province of Ourense, in Galicia, Spain. It extends over the territories of 20 different municipalities that conform a zone and entity called Ribeira Sacra, which could be translated as "Sacred Shore". The vineyards are planted on the steep slopes of the valleys and canyons of the rivers Miño and Sil. The area acquired official Denominación de Origen status in 1996.

Three types of varietal wine are produced: red Mencía, white Albariño and white Godello.

History
Its first name in Latin was Roboira Sacrata (Sacred Oak Grove) but a bad translation made in the XVII century by a monk, changed it to Ribeira Sacra (Sacred Riverside) until nowadays. It is generally believed that grape growing and wine production were introduced to the area by the ancient Romans.
It is said that the legendary spiced Vinos de Amandi were shipped to Rome along with the lampreys fished out of the river Miño, to be served at the table of the emperor.

It is believed that Ribeira Sacra takes its name from 18 monasteries and hermitages that were founded in the early Middle Ages between the 8th and 12th centuries and which are located in the inaccessible river valleys. It was the monks who replanted the vineyards for their own consumption and maintained the grape-growing and wine-producing tradition until modern times. The most important monasteries are:
 San Pedro de Bembibre
 Taboada dos Freires
 San Paio de Diomondi
 Santo Estevo de Ribas de Miño
 Santa María de Pesqueiras
 Montederramo
 San Pedro de Rocas
 Ferreira de Pantón
 San Paio de Abeleda
 Santa Cristina de Ribas de Sil
 San Estevo de Ribas de Sil

Geography
The area is divided into five sub-regions, each with a different micro-climate, but in general all the soils are alluvial over a slate based subsoil.

The sub-zones and the municipalities contained within them have been listed below (the sub-regions were split by parish and so some municipalities are listed more than once):

 Chantada: Portomarín, Taboada, Chantada, Carballedo, Peroxa
 Amandi: Sober, Monforte de Lemos
 Ribeiras do Miño: Paradela, O Saviñao, Pantón, Sober, Monforte de Lemos
 Ribeiras do Sil: A Teixeira, Parada de Sil, Castro Caldelas, Nogueira de Ramuín
 Quiroga-Bibei: Monforte de Lemos, Pobra do Brollón, Quiroga, Ribas de Sil, Pobra de Trives, Manzaneda, San Xoán de Río

Climate
The climate in Ribeira Sacra DO is more continental than Atlantic, and has long hot summers and cool autumns. However, rainfall is high (around 800 mm per year).

The sub-zones on the river Miño have more rain (900 mm) than the ones on the river Sil (700 mm). In general, the Miño area has a more Atlantic climate whereas the Sil area is more continental.

Winds can be very strong as they are funnelled by the shape of the valleys.

Grapes

The Recommended red varieties are: Mencía, Brancellao, Merenzao, Sousón, Caiño Tinto, and Tempranillo; also authorized are Garnacha tintorera, Mouratón.

The Recommended white varieties are: Godello, Loureira, Treixadura, Dona Branca, Albariño, and Torrontés.

The vineyards are planted on terraces (known as bancadas) in the narrow valleys of the rivers and are characterized by the production of grapes with a very concentrated flavor. The terraces are usually very small, making it impossible to mechanize the vineyard activities, such as pruning and harvesting. Access is often very difficult and sometimes only possible from the river.

See also
Galician wine
Spanish wine

References

External links 
 D.O. Ribeira Sacra official website

Wine regions of Spain
Galicia (Spain)